Balletto Glacier is near the summit of Mount Kilimanjaro in Tanzania, on the southwest slope of the peak and is a small remnant of an icecap which once crowned the top of Mount Kilimanjaro. Balletto Glacier is situated on the enormous  rock wall known as the "Breach Wall" and is below Diamond Glacier.

See also
Retreat of glaciers since 1850
List of glaciers in Africa

References

Glaciers of Tanzania